The Big One is a 1997 documentary film written and directed by documentarian filmmaker and activist Michael Moore, and released by Miramax Films. The film documents Moore during his tour promoting his 1996 book Downsize This! around the United States. Through the 47 towns he visits, Moore discovers and describes American economic failings and the fear of unemployment of American workers.

Background
Much of the film features Moore unsuccessfully chasing the heads and chief executives of major corporations around the US in order to confront them or conduct a personal in-depth interview. He is eventually able to talk with Nike. The film criticizes President Bill Clinton, and other major candidates in the 1996 presidential election, for failure to address economic issues. It discusses Clinton's betrayal of progressive economic ideals.

References

External links
 

 

1997 films
American business films
American documentary films
Films directed by Michael Moore
Films shot in Minnesota
Films shot in Portland, Oregon
Documentary films about business
1997 documentary films
Unemployment in the United States
1990s English-language films
1990s American films
Films about companies